Kırtıl is a small village in Silifke district of Mersin Province, Turkey. It is situated on the southern slopes of the Taurus Mountains. The population of the village was 57 as of 2012. Main economic activity of the village is farming.

References

Villages in Silifke District